Edward Thomas O'Brien (September 12, 1914 – September 15, 1976) was an American runner who competed mainly in the 400 meters.  He competed for the United States in the 1936 Summer Olympics held in Berlin, Germany, in the 4 x 400 meter relay, where he won the silver medal with his teammates Harold Cagle, Robert Young and Alfred Fitch.

O'Brien was All-American in the 400 meters three years in a row. He graduated from Syracuse University in 1937, and was inducted into the Syracuse Hall of Fame, with his trophies on display there. He married Florence Quintin in 1937. He enlisted in the United States Navy in December 1941, serving on a destroyer in the South Pacific.

He had one child, Edward T. O'Brien Jr., a psychologist who resides in Clearwater, Florida. O'Brien died on September 15, 1976 of colon cancer after living for several years at his home in Bermuda.

References
 

1914 births
1976 deaths
American male sprinters
Athletes (track and field) at the 1936 Summer Olympics
Olympic silver medalists for the United States in track and field
Syracuse University alumni
Medalists at the 1936 Summer Olympics
United States Navy personnel of World War II
Deaths from colorectal cancer
Deaths from cancer in Bermuda